The Jacaré Grande River is a river of Pará state in north-central Brazil. It is considered an extension of the Rio Pará distribution channel.

The Jacaré Grande River rises on the island of Marajó in the delta region where the Amazon and Tocantins rivers empty into the Atlantic Ocean.
It is contained within the Marajó Archipelago Environmental Protection Area.

See also
List of rivers of Pará

References

Rivers of Pará
Tributaries of the Amazon River